Sisco or Sisko may refer to:

 Sisco, Haute-Corse, a commune in Corsica, France
 Sisco (stream), a coastal stream in Corsica, France
 Sisco, Washington, a community in the United States

Persons with the surname
 Andrew Sisco (born 1983), American baseball pitcher
 Chance Sisco (born 1995), American baseball catcher
 Jack Sisco (1904–1983), American football player, coach, and official
 Kristina Sisco (born 1982), American actress

Fictional characters
 Karen Sisco, a United States Marshal created by novelist Elmore Leonard, also appearing in a television series and the film Out of Sight.
 From the television series, Star Trek: Deep Space Nine:
 Benjamin Sisko
 Jake Sisko
 Jennifer Sisko
 Joseph Sisko

See also
 Sisqó (born 1978), American R&B singer, songwriter, record producer, dancer and actor
 Gene Siskel, American film critic and journalist